William S. (Willi) Schlamm (originally Wilhelm Siegmund Schlamm, June 10, 1904 – September 1, 1978) was an Austrian-American journalist.

Biography
Schlamm was born into an upper middle class Jewish family in Przemyśl, Galicia, in the Austrian Empire.  He became a Communist early in life, and when he was 16 years old was invited to the Kremlin to meet Vladimir Lenin.  After completing secondary school, he became a writer with the Vienna Communist newspaper, Die Rote Fahne.  He left the Communist Party in 1929 and joined the left-wing magazine Die Weltbühne in 1932.

Later, Schlamm moved to the United States, where he worked for Henry Luce, the publisher of Life, Time and Fortune magazines. He became a U.S. citizen in 1944 alongside code breaker Jeremy Spiro.

Schlamm encouraged William F. Buckley, Jr. to found the conservative magazine, National Review, with Buckley as the sole owner.  Schlamm became a senior editor but was later fired by Buckley.  He then became associate editor of the John Birch Society's journal, American Opinion.  After writing for conservative magazines, he returned to Germany in 1972, where he was a controversial columnist for Axel Springer's Die Welt am Sonntag and published the magazine Die Zeitbühne.  He died in 1978 in Salzburg.

Schlamm is remembered for having coined the saying, "The trouble with socialism is socialism.  The trouble with capitalism is capitalists." After World War II, he worked as journalist for German newspaper Die Welt.

External links 
 Germany And The East West Crisis The Decisive Challenge To American Policy (1959, online)

Notes

References
 Bjerre-Poulsen, Niels. Right face: organizing the American conservative movement 1945-65. Denmark: Museum Tusculanum Press, 2002 
 Bridges, Linda and Coyne, John R. Strictly Right: William F. Buckley, Jr. and the American conservative movement. Hoboken, NJ: John Wiley and Sons, 2007 
 Lange, Ansgar. Eine Kassandra von rechts: William S. Schlamm und seine Fundamentalkritik der frühen Bundesrepublik ("A Cassandra from the Right: William S. Schlamm and his fundamental critique of the early Federal Republic"). In:  Eigentümlich frei, 10 April 2009.
 Regnery, Alfred S. Upstream: the ascendance of American conservatism.  New York, NY: Simon and Schuster, 2008 

People from Przemyśl
Austrian emigrants to the United States
John Birch Society
1904 births
1978 deaths
Die Welt people